KEO is the name of  a proposed space time capsule which was to have been launched in 2003 carrying messages from the citizens of present Earth to humanity 50,000 years from now, when it would re-enter Earth's atmosphere. Everyone was invited to contribute to the time capsule, and the organizers encouraged everybody to gather messages from children, senior citizens, and the illiterate so that every culture and demographic on Earth was represented. Moreover, the organizers were committed to not filtering the messages, stating "all the messages received, without undergoing any censorship, will be embarked aboard KEO." The launch has been delayed several times due to major geopolitical shakeups, including 9/11 and the restructuring of the ESA. , no launch date has been confirmed.

Contents 
Personal messages
A sample of air
A sample of sea water
A sample of earth
A diamond that encases a drop of human blood chosen at random with the DNA of the human genome engraved on one of its facets. 
An astronomical clock that shows the current rotation rates of several pulsars
Photographs of people of all cultures
 "the contemporary Library of Alexandria", an encyclopedic compendium of current human knowledge.

Technical aspects 
The messages and library will be encoded in glass-made radiation-resistant DVDs. Symbolic instructions in several formats will show the future finders how to build a DVD reader. 

The satellite has enough capacity  to carry a four-page message from each of the more than six billion (as of the original 2009 deadline) inhabitants on the planet. Once the satellite is launched, the messages will be made freely available on the web.

The satellite itself is a hollow sphere 80 cm in diameter. The sphere is engraved with a map of Earth and surrounded by an aluminium layer, a thermal layer and several layers of titanium and other heavy materials intertwined with vacuum. The sphere is resistant to cosmic radiation, atmosphere re-entry, space junk impacts, etc. For its first few years in orbit, KEO will sport a pair of wings 10 meters across that will aid in its spotting from Earth. As the satellite enters the atmosphere, the thermal layer will produce an artificial aurora to give a signal of the satellite's re-entry. The passive satellite will not carry any communications or propulsion systems. It will be launched by an Ariane 5 rocket into an orbit 1,800 km high, an altitude that will bring it back to Earth in 500 centuries, the same amount of time that has elapsed since early humans started to draw on cavern walls.

Timeline

Popular culture 
 Life After People: Season 2 Episode 3, "Crypt of Civilization", mentions KEO as one of the last time capsules in the universe.

See also 

Time capsules
 List of time capsules
 Crypt of Civilization
 Westinghouse Time Capsules

Spacecraft
 Voyager
 Rosetta 
 LAGEOS (satellite) 
 Apollo 11 Lunar Module
 Pioneer 10 and Pioneer 11

Organizations
 Long Now Foundation

References

Further reading 
 Bridges, Andrew (31 July 2000). KEO: The 50,000-Year Mission to Earth Space.com
 Stenger, Richard (29 August 2000). KEO time capsule could remain in orbit until 52001 AD CNN.com
 HowStuffWorks.com (5 September 2000). Time Capsule to Orbit Earth for 50,000 Years HowStuffWorks.com
 The Hindu Business Line (29 August 2002). Hutch brings space-time capsule project to India The Hindu Business Line
 ChennaiOnline.com (4 September 2002). KEO, a time capsule in space! ChennaiOnline.com
 Ashraf, Syed Firdaus (15 October 2003). Once upon a time, 50,000 years ago... Rediff.com
 EUROPA (28 May 2004). New satellite carries hopes and dreams of humanity EUROPA
 Message To Earth's Future (1 June 2009) Message To Earth's Future The Wondrous
 Wayne, Gregory (9 August 2011). A Short History of Long-Term Thinking for Our 50,000 Year Time Capsule Motherboard

External links 
 KEO website
Proposed spacecraft
Time capsules
1994 introductions